Catocrocis is a monotypic snout moth genus described by Émile Louis Ragonot in 1891. Its only species, Catocrocis lithosialis, was described in the same article. It is found in Brazil.

References

Pyralini
Monotypic moth genera
Moths of South America
Pyralidae genera
Taxa named by Émile Louis Ragonot